is a  town located in Sorachi Subprefecture, Hokkaido, Japan.

As of September 2016, the town has an estimated population of 2,463. The total area is 47.26 km2.

Culture

Mascot

He is a scarecrow with a cape. He usually attends not only events held in Chippubetsu but events outside of the town. His hat can tell time.

References

External links

Official Website 

Towns in Hokkaido